The Samaritan Hospital (or Nottingham Samaritan Hospital) was a hospital in Raleigh Street, Nottingham, England.

History
The hospital opened in March 1885 in a building which had originally been known as Sandfield House. The Raleigh Bicycle Company was founded on the same street, just two years later, in 1887.

In the 1894 White's Directory of Nottinghamshire the following was listed in relation to the hospital:

In 1923 it merged with Nottingham Castle Gate Hospital, 29-31 Castle Gate, to become the Nottingham Women's Hospital in Peel Street. The building in Raleigh Street became a private nursing facility known as St Mary's Nursing Home which closed in 1972.

References 

Hospital buildings completed in 1855
Defunct hospitals in England
Maternity hospitals in the United Kingdom
Hospitals in Nottinghamshire
Buildings and structures in Nottingham